James Browning (died January 1983) was a British trade union leader.

Browning began working in a textile mill in 1930, based in the mule spinning department.  During World War II, he served in the Royal Navy, then in 1946 he returned to his old job.

Back in the mill, Browning became increasingly active in his trade union, the Oldham Provincial Card and Blowing Room and Ring Frame Operatives' Association.  In 1952 he was elected as the union's assistant secretary, and he succeeded as its general secretary the following year.  The union was affiliated to the Cardroom Amalgamation, and Browning was elected as its president in 1964, also becoming president of the United Textile Factory Workers' Association.

In 1974, the Cardroom Amalgamation became part of the new Amalgamated Textile Workers' Union, and Browning was elected as its first president.  He also served on the management committee of the General Federation of Trade Unions, including a year as its chair.

Browning retired from his trade union posts in 1976, becoming part-time chair of the Oldham Area Health Authority.

References

Year of birth missing
1983 deaths
People from Oldham
Presidents of the General Federation of Trade Unions (UK)
Presidents of the United Textile Factory Workers' Association
Royal Navy sailors